List of schools in Tulsa, Oklahoma, United States:

Districts

Public K-12
Tulsa Public Schools is the largest school district in Oklahoma. 

The public school districts in the city of Tulsa are:

Tulsa, Oklahoma Public Schools 
Union, Oklahoma Public Schools 

See also: List of high schools in Oklahoma, Tulsa County

Private K-12

There are multiple private elementary and middle schools in the Tulsa metropolitan area. Most are affiliated with a specific religion or place of worship. Among the largest are:

Bishop Kelley High School (9-12) (Catholic, Lasallian) 
Cascia Hall Preparatory School (6-12) (Catholic, Augustinian) 
Holland Hall (Pre-12) (Episcopal) 
Lincoln Christian School (Tulsa, OK) (Pre-12)
Metro Christian Academy (Pre-12) (Interdenominational Christian) 
Mingo Valley Christian School (Pre-12) (Nondenominational Christian) 
Monte Cassino School (Pre-8) (Catholic, Benedictine) 
Victory Christian School (K-12) (Victory Christian Center Church, interdenominational) 
Augustine Christian Academy (K-12) (Non-denominational, Evangelical)
Riverfield Country Day School (Infants-12) (Not religiously affiliated)

Other private schools in the Tulsa area include many schools operated by the Roman Catholic Diocese of Tulsa (sometimes with help from religious orders). Among them are:

All Saints Catholic School (P-8)
Holy Family Cathedral School (P-8)
Marian Academy (P-5)
Marquette Catholic School (P-8)
Saint Catherine School (P-8)
Saint John Catholic School (K-8)
Saint Pius X Catholic School (P-8)
Saints Peter & Paul Catholic School (P-8)
Saint Joseph Catholic School (P-8)
School of St. Mary (P-8)

High schools
Tulsa Public Schools
Booker T. Washington High School, Tulsa
Central High School, Tulsa
East Central High School, Tulsa
Edison Preparatory School, Tulsa
McLain High School for Science and Technology, Tulsa
Memorial High School, Tulsa
Nathan Hale High School, Tulsa
Will Rogers High School, Tulsa
Daniel Webster High School, Tulsa
Union Public Schools, Tulsa
Union High School
Augustine Christian Academy, Tulsa
Berryhill High School, Tulsa
Bishop Kelley High School, Tulsa
Cascia Hall Preparatory School, Tulsa
Charles Page High School, Sand Springs
Dove Science Academy, Tulsa
Holland Hall, Tulsa
Metro Christian Academy, Tulsa
Mingo Valley Christian School, Tulsa
Riverfield Country Day School, Tulsa
Tulsa School of Arts and Sciences, Tulsa
Victory Christian School, Tulsa
Wright Christian Academy, Tulsa

Other schools and institutions
University Language Institute - Tulsa (private English as a second language)
Discovery School of Tulsa (K-9)
 
Tulsa